Forbidden Places is the seventh studio album by the Meat Puppets, released in 1991. It is their first release on London Records.

Music 
Opening with what Greg Prato described as "razor-sharp rock" on "Sam", Forbidden Places explored several styles including blues on "Nail it Down" and country on "Six Gallon Pie" and "That's How It Goes".

Reception 

AllMusic's Greg Prato proclaimed Forbidden Places to be "one of [the band's] finest albums", complementing the album's more country-informed tracks as "splendidly" showing off the Meat Puppets' "cowboy roots".

In August 1991, Greg Kot of the Chicago Tribune praised Forbidden Places, awarding it three and a half-of-four stars and writing that the band's "casual brilliance becomes more dazzling with each play".

Track listing
All songs written by Curt Kirkwood.

   "Sam" – 3:05
   "Nail It Down" – 3:32
   "This Day" – 3:14
   "Open Wide" – 3:11
   "Another Moon" – 3:39
   "That's How It Goes" – 3:24
   "Whirlpool" – 3:31
   "Popskull" – 3:05
   "No Longer Gone" – 3:56
   "Forbidden Places" – 2:59
   "Six Gallon Pie" – 3:24

Personnel
Meat Puppets
Curt Kirkwood - guitar, vocals, cover
Cris Kirkwood - bass, backing vocals, illustration
Derrick Bostrom - drums, percussion
with:
Skip Edwards - organ on "Nail It Down" and "Another Moon", piano on "That's How It Goes"
Alex Acuña - percussion on "Another Moon", "Whirlpool" and "No Longer Gone"
Tommy Funderbunk - backing vocals on "Nail It Down"
Peter Doell - additional backing vocals on "No Longer Gone"

References

Meat Puppets albums
1991 albums
Albums produced by Pete Anderson
London Records albums